Ann My Dice is a Dutch metalcore band from Rotterdam formed in 2011. The band is named after model Annemijn Dijs, who suggested the name to the band as some of the members know her personally. The band released their first full-length album To Start A Journey on 6 September 2015 through Profane Records. In January 2019, the group won the Audience Award at Utrecht Popprijs, a band competition in the city of Utrecht. The band released a single and accompanying music video called "Whisper in the Dark" on 25 March 2019, which was to tease the release of their extended play Thorn, which was released 19 April 2019.

Members 

 Jorn de Kleine- Bass, backing vocals (2011–present)
 Tim van Vliet- Drums, backing vocals (2011–present)
 Ian Izeboud- Guitar, backing vocals (2011–present)
 Nils Stok- Lead vocals, guitar (2011–present)

Discography 

 Demo 2013
 Wreckage (single, 2014)
 Never Back Down (single, 2014)
 To Start A Journey (2015, Profane)
 Thorn EP (2019, Profane)

References

External links 
 Official website
 Facebook
 Bandcamp
 YouTube channel

Musical groups established in 2011
Metalcore musical groups
Musical groups from Rotterdam
2011 establishments in the Netherlands